The Sonali Bag or Golden Bag or Jute Polymer or Eco-friendly Poly Bag  is a cellulose-based biodegradable bioplastic alternative to plastic bags, particularly polythene bags, developed in Bangladesh by Mubarak Ahmad Khan. The cellulose used in Sonali Bags is extracted from jute, a major vegetable fiber crop grown across the globe.

History
Polythene bags were banned in Bangladesh in 2002 because of environmental concern. The legislation added impetus to the research and development of natural fiber composite (NFC) material as an alternative to polythene. Mubarak Ahmad Khan, a scientist at Bangladesh Atomic Energy Commission, in collaboration with other researchers from Bangladesh, developed a range of NFC material in a decades-long effort. Subsequently, in 2018, Bangladesh Jute Mills Corporation (BJMC) started the commercial production of Sonali Bag using a Jute-based NFC developed by Mubarak Ahmad Khan.  The product was named "Sonali Bag" (sonali is Bengali for "golden") by Bangladesh Prime Minister Sheikh Hasina, a nod to jute's denomination as the 'Golden Fiber'.

References

Jute
Bangladeshi inventions